The 481st Tactical Fighter Training Squadron is an inactive United States Air Force fighter squadron. Its last assignment was with the 27th Tactical Fighter Wing at Cannon Air Force Base, New Mexico, where it was inactivated on 8 July 1980.

The first predecessor of the squadron was the 481st Bombardment Squadron, which served as a Replacement Training Unit for Martin B-26 Marauder crews during World War II, until it was disbanded in 1944, when the Army Air Forces reorganized its training units.

The second predecessor of the squadron was organized at Bergstrom Air Force Base, Texas in 1957 as the 481st Fighter-Bomber Squadron, when the 27th Fighter-Bomber Wing expanded from three to four squadrons.  It moved to Cannon Air Force Base later that year, absorbing the personnel and equipment of another squadron.  It trained in tactical fighter operations and participated in deployments until inactivating in 1973.

History

World War II
The first predecessor of the squadron was activated as the 481st Bombardment Squadron at MacDill Field, Florida in July 1942 as one of the four original squadrons of the 336th Bombardment Group.  It served as a Replacement Training Unit (RTU) for Martin B-26 Marauder crews.  RTUs were oversized units that trained individual pilots and aircrews.  The squadron relocated to several bases in Florida before settling at Lake Charles Army Air Field, Louisiana in November 1943.

However, standard military units like the 481st, based on relatively inflexible tables of organization were not proving well adapted to the training mission.  Accordingly, the Army Air Forces adopted a more functional system for its training units in which each base was organized into a separate numbered unit.  The 481st and other training and support organizations at Lake Charles were disbanded and replaced by the 332d AAF Base Unit (Medium Bombardment).

Tactical fighter unit
In the summer of 1957, Strategic Air Command transferred its fighter units, including the 27th Strategic Fighter Wing at Bergstrom Air Force Base, to Tactical Air Command (TAC), which renamed the wing the 27th Fighter-Bomber Wing.  The wing was just beginning to convert from the Republic F-84F Thunderstreak to the McDonnell F-101 VooDoo.  As part of this conversion, the wing added a fourth squadron, the 481st Fighter-Bomber Squadron, which was the second predecessor of the squadron.  Although activated on 15 September, the squadron did not begin to become operational until about 17 December 1957.

On 12 December 1957, the new squadron's first commander and wing F-101 project officer, Major Adrian E. Drew, flew a Voodoo to set a world speed record of 1,207.6 mph and 1,212.8 mph in the opposite direction over a closed course in the Mojave Desert. Personnel and F-101 aircraft were received early in 1958 and by mid-year, the 481st was combat ready. In January 1959 the redesignated 481st Tactical Fighter Squadron become non-operational when the 27th Wing's F-101s sent its F-101s to the United Kingdom.

After the F-101 aircraft were transferred, the 27th Wing and its squadrons moved on paper to Cannon Air Force Base, New Mexico, where it absorbed the personnel and equipment of the 312th Tactical Fighter Wing, which was simultaneously inactivated.  In this move, the squadron absorbed the personnel and North American F-100 Super Sabres of the 477th Tactical Fighter Squadron.

Within five months of receiving their first F-100 aircraft, the 481st deployed to Hahn Air Base, Germany, to engage in daytime air defense operations. During this rotation, the Squadron set a TAC record for deploying and redeploying without an abort or incident. During a deployment in April, 1961, the 481st sent a flight of four F-100s non-stop from Nellis Air Force Base, Nevada, to RAF Lakenheath, England. The aircraft returned to England Air Force Base, Louisiana, in time for the entire Squadron to deploy to RAF Weathersfield, England, on 9 May 1961. On 12 June 1961, the Squadron moved to Incirlik Air Base, Turkey, to fulfill its first NATO commitment. At Incirlik, the Squadron assumed an alert posture and remained until October of that year. With its parent Wing and two sister Squadrons, the 481st deployed to MacDill Air Force Base, Florida, where it maintained a constant alert posture in response to the Cuban Missile Crisis from October to December 1962.

Between 1963 and 1973, aircraft and personnel from the 481st deployed many times to various parts of the world, including Europe, Iran, Saudi Arabia, Taiwan, Thailand and Japan. Some of the known deployments and history are listed below.

10 November 1963 - A deployment of 75 days to Takhli Royal Thai Air Force Base, Thailand

14 November 1963 – Operation Hard Surface – A deployment to Dhahran, Saudi Arabia.  This operation had started with another unit, probably from Cannon AFB, on 4 May 1963. The 481st participated in this operation from 14 November 1963 to 1 February 1964.  The units assigned to this operation were awarded the Air Force Outstanding Unit Award.

31 March 1964 – Exercise Delawar, a Baghdad Pact-sponsored joint training exercise with the Imperial Iranian Air Force.  The 481st and the 429th Tactical Fighter Squadrons deployed to Vahdati Air Base at Dezful Iran, with 36 aircraft and over 500 personnel.

7 May 1964 – Exercise Desert Strike.  This was a joint Air Force and Army training exercise that took place in California, Nevada and Arizona and lasted two weeks.  It involved nearly 100,000 personnel, fifteen active Air Force fighter squadrons, and numerous other flying squadrons and support units from the active military, the Air National Guard and the Air Force Reserve.

1 September 1964 – The squadron was sent on a 120-day rotational deployment to Misawa Air Base, Japan.  During this time, some aircraft of the 481st also went to Kung Kuan Air Base, Taiwan. While in Taiwan, the aircraft took part in Operation Sky Soldier VI.

The 481st was selected as the outstanding fighter unit TAC for two consecutive quarters in 1964.  In June 1965, the squadron was the first to respond and depart during a full scale no-notice Operational Readiness Inspection conducted by a TAC inspection team.

Vietnam War

In the Spring of 1965, notification was received that the squadron would deploy to Vietnam in late June for a combat tour. On 11 June 1965, without prior warning, the squadron was alerted to deploy within twenty-four hours and left Cannon on 12 June 1965 under the code name Operation Two Buck 16.  After a one-week delay at Clark Air Base in the Philippines, the squadron arrived at Tan Son Nhut Airport on 21 June 1965 and began flying combat missions on that first day in South Vietnam.

On the night of 19 July, the Army Special Forces camp at Bu Dop, about 100 miles north of Saigon, came under attack by the Viet Cong.  Air strikes by Capt. Norm Turner and 1st Lt. Donald Watson of the 481st were credited with "probably saving the camp that night" and both pilots were awarded the Distinguished Flying Cross for their actions.  Just eleven days after this mission, Lt. Watson of Tripoli, Wisconsin, was killed while flying another air interdiction mission.  The squadron averaged over 30 sorties a days and by 6 September 1965, the Crusaders had completed 2,000 hours of combat flying.

In November, many sorties were flown in support of the battle of Plei Me and airstrikes by the 481st and other fighter units were "given much of the credit for turning the battle of Plei Me from disaster into victory."   When the North Vietnamese left Plei Me and Pleiku, they moved west and the 481st again supported ground troops in the battle that developed in the Ia Drang Valley.  While deployed to Vietnam, the 481st aircraft had green triangles painted on the tails which allowed the Forward Air Controllers to easily identify the F-100s they were controlling as being part of the 481st.  The F-100s and their assigned pilots that deployed to Vietnam are listed below:

 
* Indicates aircraft that were shot down on combat missions. A replacement aircraft, serial number 56-3334 was also shot down.
 
The deaths of Lts. Watson and Hauschildt were part of a larger coincidental tragedy.  When four friends who had attended the Air Force Academy together were all assigned to Cannon AFB as pilots, they decided to pool their money and buy a house.  Three of the four pilots were assigned to the 481st and the fourth, Lt. Thomas McAtee, was assigned to the 429th Tactical Fighter Squadron. In the space of ten weeks, three of the four friends were killed.  On 29 July 1965, Lt. Donald D. Watson was killed in South Vietnam.  On 23 August 1965, Ralph Ford was killed on a training flight near Nara Visa, New Mexico and on 5 October 1965, Lt. John Hauschildt was killed on a bombing mission in South Vietnam.  Lt. McAtee was in Vietnam during this time and had flown 36 combat missions with the 429th TFS.  He was shocked to learn of the deaths of his three friends and returned to Clovis, New Mexico in October 1965 to sell the house.

By 27 November 1965, the 481st was headed back to Cannon and had flown more than 3,600 combat sorties and established a 98% aircraft in commission rate that assured every combat mission was flown as scheduled. During this deployment to Vietnam, the 481st accumulated 5,025 hours of combat flight-time.

Shortly after returning to Cannon, the 481st became a RTU charged with training F-100 pilots for worldwide assignments. The mission of the squadron did not change until 5 September 1968 when it began preparing for the receipt of F-111 aircraft and a return to tactical operations. From that date until it was inactivated on 1 July 1969, the squadron possessed no aircraft and was not operational.

F-111 era
Although 1 July 1969 saw the 481st manned again, it did not receive its first F-111E until 30 September 1969. By the close of 1969, the squadron had 24 F-111E aircraft assigned and was in training toward a status of being operationally ready when the F-111 fleet was grounded on 28 December 1969, due to the failure of a F-111's wing at Nellis Air Force Base. During the ensuing down time, the 481st utilized a few F-100s of the 524th Tactical Fighter Squadron as well as AT-33s of the 27th Combat Support Group to maintain proficiency. The 481st pilots also supported the 2nd Aircraft Delivery Group by ferrying F-100s from Europe to the U.S. and from the U.S. to Southeast Asia.

Beginning 10 May 1971, the 481st began ferrying its F-111Es to the 20th Tactical Fighter Wing at RAF Upper Heyford, England. The last aircraft left Cannon on 27 July 1971 and two days later the 4427th Tactical Training Squadron absorbed the remaining personnel and resources of the squadron. The 481st was again nonoperational from 31 July 1971 until 12 November 1972 when several 524th aircrews were transferred. Squadron crews underwent extensive training at Nellis and Cannon, and flew the first F-111D mission on 2 March 1973. The 481st was again inactivated on 31 August 1973 with the 523rd Tactical Fighter Squadron absorbing it resources.

The squadron was reactivated on 15 January 1976 as an F-111D tactical fighter training squadron. From that time until its retirement on 1 January 1980, the 481st remained the primary training squadron for F-111D aircrews.

Consolidation
The 481st Bombardment Squadron was reconstituted on 19 September 1985 and consolidated with the 481st Tactical Fighter Training Squadron, which remained in inactive status.

Lineage
 481st Bombardment Squadron
 Constituted as the 481st Bombardment Squadron on 9 July 1942
 Activated on 15 July 1942
 Disbanded on 1 May 1944
 Reconstituted on 19 September 1985 and consolidated with the 481st Tactical Fighter Training Squadron as the 481st Tactical Fighter Training Squadron

 481st Tactical Fighter Training Squadron
 Constituted as the 481st Fighter-Bomber Squadron on 30 August 1957
 Activated on 25 September 1957
 Redesignated 481st Tactical Fighter Squadron on 1 July 1958
 Inactivated on 31 August 1973
 Redesignated 481st Tactical Fighter Training Squadron on 1 January 1976
 Activated on 15 January 1976
 Inactivated on 8 July 1980
 Consolidated with the 481st Bombardment Squadron on 19 September 1985

Assignments
 336th Bombardment Group, 15 July 1942 – 1 May 1944
 27th Fighter-Bomber Wing (later 27th Tactical Fighter Wing), 25 September 1957 – 31 August 1973 (detached 1–25 June 1959, 9 June–11 October 1961, 24 April–20 May 196319 November 1963–1 February 1964, 9 April–c. 20 April 1964, 2 September–4 December 1964, 15 June–30 June 1965)
 27th Tactical Fighter Wing, 15 January 1976 – 8 July 1980

Stations
 Bergstrom Air Force Base, Texas, 25 September 1957 
 Cannon Air Force Base, New Mexico, 18 February 1959 – 31 August 1973
 Cannon Air Force Base, New Mexico, 15 January 1976 – 8 July 1980

Aircraft
 Martin B-26 Marauder
 McDonnell F-101 Voodoo, 1958
 North American F-100D/F Super Sabre, 1958-1973
 General Dynamics F-111D Aardvark, 1976-1980

References

Notes
 Explanatory notes

 Citations

Bibliography

External links
 

Fighter squadrons of the United States Air Force
Curry County, New Mexico